Nigel Stock  (21 September 1919 - 23 June 1986) was a British actor who played character roles in many films and television dramas. He was perhaps best known for his stint as Dr Watson in TV adaptations of the Sherlock Holmes stories, for his supporting roles as a solidly reliable English soldier or bureaucrat in several war and historical film dramas, and for playing the title role in Owen, M.D..

Early life 
Stock was born in Malta, the son of an Army captain. He grew up in India before attending St Paul's School, London and the Royal Academy of Dramatic Art, where he earned the Leverhulme Exhibition, Northcliffe Scholarship, and the Principal's Medal.

Military service
Stock served in the Second World War with the London Irish Rifles and the Assam Regiment of the Indian Army in Burma, China and Kohima. He was honourably discharged with the rank of Major, having twice been mentioned in dispatches.

Acting 
He made his stage debut in 1931, and during his career achieved numerous classical and contemporary credits at various distinguished theatres, including the Old Vic and on Broadway, with productions of The Winter's Tale, Macbeth, She Stoops to Conquer, Uncle Vanya. His start in films came with uncredited bit parts in The Man Who Could Work Miracles (1938) and Goodbye, Mr. Chips (1939). In 1937 he made his first credited film appearance in Lancashire Luck.

After his wartime service, he returned to acting. His film appearances included popular releases such as Brighton Rock (1947), The Dam Busters (1955), The Great Escape (1963), The Lion in Winter and The Lost Continent (both 1968), and Russian Roulette (1975).

Between 1964 and 1968, Nigel Stock became a household name in the UK for his portrayal of Dr. Watson in a series of Sherlock Holmes dramas for BBC television. Later in life, he portrayed the mentor of Sherlock Holmes in Young Sherlock Holmes. His other numerous television credits included Danger Man (1965), The Avengers (1964 & 1966), The Prisoner (1967), The Doctors (1969–71), Owen, M.D. (1971–73), Quiller (1975), Van der Valk (1977), the Doctor Who serial Time Flight (1982), Yes Minister (1982), Tinker Tailor Soldier Spy (1979) and for a BBC dramatisation of A Tale of Two Cities (1980) as well as The Pickwick Papers (1985) as Mr. Pickwick.

Stock and his third wife, Richenda Carey, had just appeared together on stage in the world premiere of Mumbo Jumbo in May 1986, when, on 23 June 1986, he died in Camden, London of a heart attack, aged 66.

Personal life and death
Stock was married three times. He married his first wife, Catherine Hodnett, in 1943; the couple had one son and divorced in 1947. His second marriage was to Sonia Williams in 1951. They divorced in 1980 after having three children together. Stock's third marriage was to actress Richenda Carey in 1979. They remained married until his death.

Stock was found dead of "natural causes" on Monday 23 June 1986 at his home in north London.

Radio
Wimsey - Have His Carcase (BBC radio)(1981) Inspector Umpelty
Space Force (1984–85) Magnus Carter
221B (1986) Dr Watson

Selected filmography

 The Man Who Could Work Miracles (1936) – Office Boy (uncredited)
 Lancashire Luck (1937) – Joe Lovejoy
 Break the News (1938) – Stage Boy (uncredited)
 Luck of the Navy (1938)
 Goodbye, Mr. Chips (1939) – John Forrester (uncredited)
 Sons of the Sea (1939) – Rudd
 It Always Rains on Sunday (1947) – Ted Edwards
 Brighton Rock (1947) – Cubitt
 The Lady with a Lamp (1951)
 Derby Day (1952) – Jim Molloy
 Appointment in London (1953) – Co-Pilot (uncredited)
 Malta Story (1953) – Giuseppe Gonzar aka Ricardi
 Aunt Clara (1954) – Charles Willis
 The Night My Number Came Up (1955) – The Pilot
 The Dam Busters (1955) – Flying / Off. F. M. Spafford, D.F.C., D.F.M.
 Eyewitness (1956) – Barney
 The Battle of the River Plate (1956) – Chief Officer, Tairoa, Prisoner on Graf Spee (uncredited)
 The Silent Enemy (1958) – Able Seaman Fraser
 Never Let Go (1960) – Regan
 Victim (1961) – Phip
 H.M.S. Defiant (1962) – Senior Midshipman Kilpatrick
 The Password Is Courage (1962) –  Cole
 Edgar Wallace Mysteries (Episode: 'To Have and to Hold') (1963) – George Matthews -  (Working Title: BFI: 'Sleep Long, My Love')
 The Great Escape (1963) – Flt. Lt. Dennis Cavendish "The Surveyor"
 Espionage (TV series)  ('Medal for a Turned Coat', episode)  (1964) - Harry Forbes
 Nothing but the Best (1964) – Ferris
 Weekend at Dunkirk (1964) – Un soldat brûlé
 The High Bright Sun (1964) – Lt. Col. N. Park
 The Night of the Generals (1967) – Otto
 The Lost Continent (1968) – Dr. Webster
 The Lion in Winter (1968) – William Marshal
 Cromwell (1970) – Sir Edward Hyde
 Bequest to the Nation (1973) – George Matcham
 Russian Roulette (1975) – Ferguson
 Operation Daybreak (1975) – General
 The Mirror Crack'd (1980) – Inspector Gates ('Murder at Midnight')
 Yellowbeard (1983) – Admiral
 Young Sherlock Holmes (1985) – Rupert T. Waxflatter

References

External links

1986 deaths
Alumni of RADA
British Army personnel of World War II
English male film actors
English radio actors
English male stage actors
English male television actors
London Irish Rifles officers
People educated at St Paul's School, London
20th-century English male actors
British Indian Army officers
Indian Army personnel of World War II